This is a list of all stations of the Lucknow Metro, a rapid transit system serving Lucknow of India.

Lucknow Metro is the 9th metro system in India, after Kolkata Metro, Delhi Metro,  Namma Metro, Rapid Metro Gurgaon, Mumbai Metro, Jaipur Metro, Chennai Metro and Kochi Metro.

The Lucknow metro covers a distance of 22.87 km with 22 stations with 19 elevated and 3 below ground.

It is built and operated by the Lucknow Metro Rail Corporation Limited (LMRC). Its first section inaugurated on 5 September 2017 and opened for public on September 6, 2017, with the Red Line.

Metro stations

Statistics

See also

Kochi Metro
Jaipur Metro
Mumbai Metro
Kolkata Metro

References

External links

 Lucknow Metro Rail Corporation Ltd.
 Lucknow Metro Station
 UrbanRail.Net – descriptions of all metro systems in the world, each with a schematic map showing all stations.

Stations
Lucknow
Lucknow-related lists